The Kempas Baru railway station (formerly Kempas Bahru railway station) is a Malaysian train station located at and named after the town of Kempas, Johor Bahru District, Johor.

History
After years of abandonment, the Malayan Railways ordered for a new railway station built and "Kempas Baru" (which means "New Kempas" in Malay) was chosen as the new station's name.

See also
 KTM Intercity

External links
 Kempas Baru KTM Railway Station

Buildings and structures in Johor Bahru
KTM ETS railway stations
Railway stations in Johor
Transport in Johor Bahru